Darreh Khvoshi (also Romanized as Darreh Khvoshī) is a village in Kuhdasht-e Shomali Rural District, in the Central District of Kuhdasht County, Lorestan Province, Iran. At the 2006 census, its population was 131, in 24 families.

References 

Towns and villages in Kuhdasht County